P.S. I Love You is a 2007 American romantic drama film directed by Richard LaGravenese from a screenplay by LaGravenese and Steven Rogers based on the 2004 novel of the same name by Cecelia Ahern. The film stars Hilary Swank, Gerard Butler, Lisa Kudrow, Gina Gershon, James Marsters, Harry Connick Jr. and Jeffrey Dean Morgan.

The film was released in the United States on December 21, 2007, by Warner Bros. Pictures. It was critically panned, with criticism being directed at Swank's performance and the writing. However, it was a box office success, and grossed $156.8 million worldwide against a $30 million budget. In 2019 Swank expressed interest in adapting the follow-up book into a second film.

Plot
Holly and Gerry are a married couple living in Manhattan; they fight occasionally but are deeply in love. One winter, Gerry dies of a brain tumour, causing Holly to withdraw from her family and friends out of grief.

On Holly's 30th birthday, a cake is delivered along with a cassette that holds a recording from Gerry— the first of several meaningful messages all ending "P.S. I Love You", which he had arranged to have delivered to her after his death. Holly's mom, Patricia, who never warmed to the idea of her marrying Gerry when she was nineteen, is not pleased, worried that it will keep Holly tied to the past.

As each season passes, Gerry's messages fill Holly with encouragement to continue living. Having organised for Holly and her two best friends, Denise and Sharon, to travel to his homeland of Ireland, they arrive at a beautiful house in the Irish countryside and find a letter addressed to each of them; one asks Denise to take Holly to his favourite pub. While there, Holly meets William, a singer who strongly reminds her of Gerry. He dedicates a song to her, ("Galway Girl"); upon hearing it, she is overcome with emotion and walks out, realising it was the song Gerry sang to her when they first met.

While out fishing on the lake, the women lose their boat's oars, leaving them stranded. As they wait for help, Sharon announces that she is pregnant and Denise reveals she is getting married. Their news causes Holly to relapse emotionally and begin to withdraw into herself again. They are eventually rescued by William, whom Sharon and Denise invite to stay the night because of the rain. Unable to deny their feelings for each other, William and Holly have sex. They later have a conversation about Gerry and, when Holly mentions his parents who she wants to go and visit, William realises she is the widow of his childhood friend. Holly panics, but William calms her down by telling her stories about his and Gerry's friendship. The next day, Holly visits Gerry's parents and while there, receives another letter, reminding her of how they met.

Arriving home, Holly continues to withdraw from her life, but is later inspired to start designing women's shoes after finding one of Gerry's suspender clips on one of her heels. She enrols in a design class and, over time, her new found confidence allows her to emerge from her solitude and genuinely embrace her friends' happiness. Holly also goes out to dinner with an old friend, Daniel, who reveals he has always had feelings for her. Knowing Holly doesn't return the same feelings, and after she calls him Gerry by mistake, Daniel leaves the restaurant.

While on a walk with her mother, Patricia hands Holly a final letter from Gerry, revealing she was the one whom he had asked to deliver all of the messages; she said she didn't think it was appropriate but also couldn't say no to him. Holly returns home to a voicemail from Daniel. They meet at Yankee Stadium and she asks him to read the letter; in it, Gerry tells her not to turn away from new love. Holly and Daniel share a kiss but then decide they are better staying as friends.

Later, Holly takes her mother on a trip to Ireland. By chance they meet William, and he expresses his wish to see her again.

Cast
 Hilary Swank as Holly Kennedy
 Gerard Butler as Gerry Kennedy, Holly's husband 
 Lisa Kudrow as Denise Hennessey, one of Holly's best friends 
 Gina Gershon as Sharon McCarthy, one of Holly's best friends
 James Marsters as John McCarthy, Sharon's husband and Gerry's best friend 
 Harry Connick Jr. as Daniel Connelly, Patricia's employee and Holly's new friend 
 Jeffrey Dean Morgan as William Gallagher, Holly's love interest and Gerry's childhood best friend 
 Nellie McKay as Ciara Reilly, Holly's sister
 Kathy Bates as Patricia Reilly, Holly and Ciara's mother
 Anne Kent as Rose Kennedy, Gerry's mother
 Brian McGrath as Martin Kennedy, Gerry's father

Production
In A Conversation with Cecilia Ahern, a bonus feature on the DVD release of the film, the author of the novel discusses the Americanization of her story — which was set in Ireland — for the screen and her satisfaction with the plot changes which screenwriter and director Richard LaGravenese had to make in order to fit the book into the screen.

The film was shot on locations in New York City and County Wicklow, Ireland. The music scenes that were set in a local Wicklow pub were filmed in Whelan's a music venue in Dublin.

Soundtrack

The soundtrack for the film was released on December 4, 2007.

 "Love You Till the End" – The Pogues
 "Same Mistake" – James Blunt
 "More Time" – Needtobreathe
 "Carousel" – Laura Izibor
 "Fortress" – Hope
 "Last Train Home" – Ryan Star
 "Rewind" – Paolo Nutini
 "My Sweet Song" – Toby Lightman
 "No Other Love" – Chuck Prophet
 "Everything We Had" – The Academy Is...
 "In the Beginning" – The Stills
 "If I Ever Leave This World Alive" – Flogging Molly
 "P.S. I Love You" – Nellie McKay
 "Kisses and Cake" – John Powell
 "Trouble" – performed by Greg Dulli and Kerry Brown
The film also includes "Fairytale of New York" performed by The Pogues, "Got Me Like Oh" by Gia Farrell, "No Other Love" by Chuck Prophet, "Mustang Sally" performed by Gerard Butler and "Galway Girl" written and originally released by Steve Earle, performed by Gerard Butler, Nancy Davis, and Jeffrey Dean Morgan. Camera Obscura's "Lloyd, I'm Ready to Be Heartbroken" also plays in the opening credits. None of songs are included on the official soundtrack.

Reception

Critical response

Review aggregation website Rotten Tomatoes gives a score of 25% based on 105 reviews, with an average rating of 4.50/10. The website's critical consensus reads, "Hilary Swank is miscast as the romantic lead in this clichéd film about loss and love." At Metacritic the film received a weighted average score of 39 out of 100, based on reviews from 24 critics, indicating "generally unfavorable reviews". Audiences surveyed by CinemaScore gave the film a grade "A-" on scale of A to F.

Manohla Dargis of The New York Times said the film "looks squeaky clean and utterly straight and very much removed from the shadow worlds in which Ms. Swank has done her best work. Yet as directed by Richard LaGravenese ... it has a curious morbid quality ... [It] won't win any awards; it isn't the sort of work that flatters a critic's taste. It's preposterous in big and small matters ... and there are several cringe-worthy set pieces, some involving Mr. Butler and a guitar. The film is not a beautiful object or a memorable cultural one, and yet it charms, however awkwardly. Ms. Swank's ardent sincerity and naked emotionalism dovetail nicely with Mr. LaGravenese's melodramatic excesses."

David Wiegand of the San Francisco Chronicle wrote, "This is a movie that will leave you stunned and stupefied from beginning to end, if you don't head for the exits first. The only good things in it are Lisa Kudrow and Swank's wardrobe. The plot is unbelievable, although a competent script could have fixed that. The direction is flabby and uninspired, the casting is wrongheaded, and the performances run the gamut from uninteresting to insufferable ... the film wants terribly to be Ghost without a potter's wheel, but it just succeeds at being terrible."

John Anderson of Variety also had a negative review: "The question of love after death has been asked frequently enough in the movies, but seldom with the high ick factor found in P.S. I Love You ... this post-life comedy will have the sentimentally challenged weeping openly, while clutching desperately to the pants-legs of boyfriends and husbands who are trying to flee up the aisle. Richard LaGravenese's trip into Lifetime territory may define the guilty pleasure of the genre ... As an exercise in chick-flickery, P.S. I Love You wants to possess the soulfulness of harsh reality and the lilt of romantic fantasy at the same time. In this case, at least, it simply can't be done."

Stephen Whitty of The Oregonian wrote, "On a week when many people just want a good reason to put down their packages and smile for a couple of hours, P.S. I Love You arrives – signed, sealed and delivered just on time."

Irish reviewers were particularly critical of Butler's Irish accent. Butler later jokingly apologized for his poor effort at an Irish accent.

Box office
The film opened on 2,454 screens in North America and earned $6,481,221 and ranked #6 on its opening weekend. It eventually grossed $53,695,808 at the North American box office and $91,370,273 in the rest of the world for a total worldwide box office of $156,835,339.

Accolades
 
Hilary Swank won the 2008 People's Choice Irish Film and Television Award for Best International Actress.

Cultural influence
Dialogue between Connick's and Swank's characters inspired Reba McEntire's 2011 single "Somebody's Chelsea".

See also
 The Letter (1997 film) (South Korea)
 The Letter (2004 film) (Thai Remake)

References

External links
 
 

2007 films
2007 romantic drama films
Alcon Entertainment films
American romantic drama films
Films about widowhood
Films based on Irish novels
Films directed by Richard LaGravenese
Films scored by John Powell
Films set in Ireland
Films set in New York City
Films shot in County Wicklow
Films shot in New York City
Films shot in Dublin (city)
Warner Bros. films
2000s English-language films
2000s American films